Brian Lienert (born 5 January 1943) is  a former Australian rules footballer who played with Richmond in the Victorian Football League (VFL) and Dandenong Football Club in the Victorian Football Association (VFA).

Notes

External links 
		

Living people
1943 births
Australian rules footballers from Victoria (Australia)
Richmond Football Club players
Hamilton Imperials Football Club players